Matthew J. Hoffman (born November 1, 1980) is an American convicted murderer known for the triple murder of Tina Herrmann, Kody Maynard, and Stephanie Sprang, as well as the kidnapping and rape of a teenage girl, which happened over the course of four days. The murders took place in Howard, Ohio. Police traced purchases for tarps found at the scene to a local Walmart which led them to Hoffman.

Murders and kidnapping 
On November 10, 2010, Hoffman broke into Herrmann’s house after camping in the woods the night before. Just as Hoffman was about to burglarize the home, Herrmann and Sprang entered the residence, surprising Hoffman. When Sprang and Herrmann confronted Hoffman, he murdered both of them, killing the family dog as well. He then began to dismember the bodies in a bathtub and place the body parts into plastic bags. While this was happening Sarah Maynard, who was 13, and Kody Maynard, who was 11, got home from school and entered the house. Hoffman then attacked and murdered Kody.

After the murders of Hermann, Sprang, and Kody Maynard, Hoffman took Sarah back to his house, binding and gagging her, then leaving her in his basement. He then dismembered the three victims and stuffed them inside a 60-foot-tall hollow tree. The family was later reported missing, and a three-day search for the four ensued. Hoffman became a suspect when items found in the house, a large tarp and large garbage bags, contained a receipt from a local Walmart. The police, using information on that receipt, used it to obtain video of Hoffman buying those items at that Walmart. It also came out later that he had been stopped by police in the area where Herrmann's truck was found but had been released after being questioned as to why he was in that area. On November 14, detectives raided Hoffman's home and Hoffman was arrested. Sarah was rescued from his basement and survived.

Trial and sentence 
While incarcerated, Hoffman wrote a ten-page confession letter where he admitted to the murders and abduction, as well as revealing the location of the three bodies. While admitting to the abduction, Hoffman claimed he treated Sarah nicely and let her play video games, watch movies, and eat hamburgers. Hoffman’s claim was contested by Sarah, with evidence of sexual assault.

Hoffman pleaded guilty to ten counts, after his bail was set to one million dollars. In January 2011, Hoffman was sentenced to life without parole.

References 

Living people
1980 births
American people convicted of murder
American murderers of children
American rapists
American prisoners sentenced to life imprisonment
People convicted of murder by Ohio
Prisoners sentenced to life imprisonment by Ohio